Erigeron aureus, the Alpine yellow fleabane, is a species of flowering plant in the family Asteraceae, native to the Cascades and Rocky Mountains of northwestern North America (Alberta, British Columbia, Washington). The specific epithet aureus means "golden yellow".

Range and Habitat
Erigeron aureus is native to the Cascades and Rocky Mountains of northwestern North America (Alberta, British Columbia, Washington). It grows in high mountains on exposed ridges and rocky slopes and in rock crevices.

Description

Cultivation
Erigeron aureus  is suitable for cultivation in a rockery, wall or similar sunny, well-drained site.

The cultivar 'Canary Bird', longer-lived than wild populations of the species, has gained the Royal Horticultural Society's Award of Garden Merit.

References

aureus
Flora of Washington (state)
Flora of Western Canada
Plants described in 1884
Flora without expected TNC conservation status